Tiê Gasparinetti Biral, simply known as Tiê (São Paulo, March 17, 1980), is a Brazilian singer-songwriter.

Life and career
The granddaughter of the actress Vida Alves, Tiê approached music in her high school years, when she founded a band and won an award in a student music competition in 1997. The turning point came when she was noticed by singer Toquinho while performing at Café Brechó, a bar-restaurant next to the MTV studios where he was recording an album.

After having joined Toquinho on tour for two years, Tiê began to prepare her own repertoire, composing her own songs and learning to play the guitar. After releasing an EP in 2007 in collaboration with musician Dudu Tsuda, she made her solo recording debut in 2009, with the album Sweet Jardim. For this album Tiê was nominated in the MPB category at the MTV Video Music Brasil.

Several of her songs were used as theme songs for telenovelas, notably "A Noite", a cover version of Arisa's "La notte", which was picked as the theme song of I Love Paraisópolis.

Discography

Studio albums

 2007 – E.P. 1 (EP)
 2009 – Sweet Jardim 
 2011 – A Coruja e o Coração 
 2014 – Esmeraldas 
 2017 – Gaya

Live albums

 2019 – Dix

References

External links

 
 
 

1980 births
Living people
Brazilian singer-songwriters
Brazilian lyricists
Música Popular Brasileira singers
Musicians from São Paulo
21st-century Brazilian singers